"Never Be You" is a 2012 song by Slovak recording artist Celeste Buckingham. Released on November 12 through iTunes, the track composed the singer along with Littlebeat producers Martin Šrámek—Andrej Hruška, and US-based musicians Aaron Harmon—Jordan Reyes, both from BoyGenius Studios. While the lyrics co-wrote Paula Winger, the music video directed by Roland Wraník was shot in a Slovak spa town, Trenčianske Teplice.

The single peaked at number forty-two on the CZ Top 100 airplay chart, and at number forty-seven on an equivalent SK playlist, Rádio Top 100 Oficiálna. Within the CZ component playlist, it charted at number nine.

Development
Buckingham wrote the lyrics in July 2012, as her own dialogue between true self and false self, or else a new recording artist versus her alter ego, described as a potentially acclaimed but arrogant music star. In addition to, Paula Winger revised some of the verses.

Credits and personnel
 Celeste Buckingham - lead vocalist, writer, lyricist, copyright
 Martin Šrámek - producer 
 Andrej Hruška - producer
 Aaron Harmon - writer
 Jordan Reyes - writer
 Paula Winger - lyricist
 Littlebeat - recording studio
 BoyGenius Studios - recording studio, mastering

Track listings
 "Never Be You" (Original version) — 2:55

Charts

References
General

Specific

External links
 CelesteBuckingham.com > Music > "Never Be You"

2012 singles
Celeste Buckingham songs
Songs written by Celeste Buckingham